Jackson County is the name of 24 counties in the United States, most of which are named after President Andrew Jackson:

Jackson County, Alabama
Jackson County, Arkansas 
Jackson County, Colorado 
Jackson County, Florida 
Jackson County, Georgia 
Jackson County, Illinois 
Jackson County, Indiana 
Jackson County, Iowa 
Jackson County, Kansas 
Jackson County, Kentucky 
Jackson Parish, Louisiana 
Jackson County, Michigan 
Jackson County, Minnesota 
Jackson County, Mississippi 
Jackson County, Missouri 
Jackson County, North Carolina
Jackson County, Ohio 
Jackson County, Oklahoma 
Jackson County, Oregon 
Jackson County, South Dakota 
Jackson County, Tennessee 
Jackson County, Texas 
Jackson County, West Virginia 
Jackson County, Wisconsin